Robert William Keely (August 22, 1909 – May 20, 2001) was an American professional baseball coach and scout, and, for one full season and parts of two others, a player.  He served as a coach in Major League Baseball for 12 seasons (1946–1957) with the Boston / Milwaukee Braves.

Born in St. Louis, Missouri, Keely stood 6' (183 cm) tall, weighed 175 pounds (79 kg), and threw and batted right-handed. Keely played one season of minor league baseball, 1937, with the Union City Greyhounds of the Class D KITTY League, but was a longtime semiprofessional catcher with the Belleville Stags. During World War II, he joined the St. Louis Cardinals as the club's bullpen catcher — an extra hand who caught relief pitchers and batting practice. He was activated for one game in 1944 and one game in 1945, going hitless in one at bat and handling two chances as a catcher without an error.

Keely formally became a major-league coach when he joined manager Billy Southworth in moving from the Cardinals to the Braves in 1946. He was the Braves' bullpen coach through the 1957 season, serving in both Boston and Milwaukee and under four different managers. He worked on the 1948 NL champions and the 1957 world champions with the club.

After leaving the Braves, Keely was a scout for the Cardinals through the mid-1970s. He died at age 91 in Sarasota, Florida.

External links

Retrosheet

References
Spink, J.G. Taylor, ed., ''The Baseball Register", St. Louis: The Sporting News, 1956.

1909 births
2001 deaths
Baseball players from St. Louis
Boston Braves coaches
Major League Baseball bullpen catchers
Major League Baseball bullpen coaches
Major League Baseball catchers
Milwaukee Braves coaches
St. Louis Cardinals players
St. Louis Cardinals scouts
Union City Greyhounds players